Manibhadra is one of the major yakshas. He was a popular deity in ancient India.

Iconography
Several well known images of yaksha Manibhadra have been found. The two oldest known image are:

Yaksha Manibhadra from Parkham

Yaksha Manibhadra coming from Parkham near Mathura, datable to period 200 BCE – 50 BC The statue is 2.59 meters high. On stylistic grounds and paleographical analysis of the inscription, the statue is datable to the middle of the 2nd century BCE. The inscription says "Made by Gomitaka, a pupil of Kunika. Set up by eight brothers, members of the Manibhadra congregation ("puga")." This inscription thus indicates that the statue represents the Yaksa Manibhadra. According to John Boardman, the hem of the dress is derived from Greek art. Describing a similar statue, John Boardman writes: "It has no local antecedents and looks most like a Greek Late Archaic mannerism". Similar folds can be seen in the Bharhut Yavana.

Yaksha Manibhadra from Padmavati Pawaya

 Yaksha Manibhadra from Padmavati Pawaya. The inscription under the image mentions a group of Manibhadra worshippers.

Both of them are monumental larger than life sculptures, often dated to Maurya or Shunga period. The Parkham Yaksha was used an inspiration by Ram Kinker Baij to carve the Yaksha image that now stands in front of the Reserve Bank of India in Delhi.

Manibhadra was often shown with a bag of money in his hand.

Hinduism
Manibhadra was a son of Kubera and his wife, Bhadra. He had a brother named Nalakuvara. In Ramayana, Manibhadra fought with Ravana to defend Lanka but failed. In the Mahabharata Manibhadra is mentioned along with Kubera as a chief of the yakshas. Arjuna had worshipped him. The Bhagvatam narrates a story about the brothers. Once Manibhadra and Nalakuvara were playing with their respective wife or apsaras in the river Ganges. They were drunk and nude. When god sage, Narada passed by to visit Vishnu, the women covered themselves but the nude brothers were too intoxicated to see the sage and started to boast about themselves. Narada wanted to teach the brothers a lesson and cursed them to be turned into trees and only to be liberated by Vishnu avatar. During Dwapada Yuga, an infant Krishna was tied to a mortar by his mother, Yashoda as a punishment for eating dirt. Krishna crawled with the mortar, however the mortar was stuck between two trees. Krishna using his divine powers uprooted the trees, liberating Nalakuvara and Manigriva from their curse.

Other legends
Another figure with the same name is mentioned to be an avatar of Shiva which he called when he was angry and summoned for warfare. Manibhadra decimated the army of Jalandhara along with Virabhadra, another avatar of Shiva. It is possible that the avatar of Shiva and the chief of the yakshas may be the same Manibhadra but there is no confirmation.  Manibhadra is also a god of sea-farers especially merchants venturing out in the sea for business in faraway lands.

Buddhism
In Samyukta Nikaya,  Manibhadra is said to reside in the Manimala chaitya  in Magadha. Yaksha Manibhadra is invoked in The Exalted Manibhadra’s Dhārani.

Jainism

In Sūryaprajñapti, a Manibhadra chairya in Mithila is mentioned. Yakshas are referred to in the Harivamsa Purana (783 A.D.) of Jinasena made the beginning of this concept. Among them, Manibhadra and Purnabadra yakshas and Bahuputrika yakshini have been the most popular. Manibhadra and Purnabadra yakshas are mentioned a chief of yakshas, Manibhadra of Northern ones and Purnabadra of Southern ones.

Manibhadra still a yaksha worshipped by the Jains, specially those affiliated with the Tapa Gachchha. Three temples are famous for association with Mandibhadra: Ujjain, Aglod (Mehsana) and Magarwada (Banaskantha).  Manibhadra Yaksha (or Vira) is a popular demigod among the Jains in Gujarat. His image can take many forms, including unshaped rocks, however in the most common representation, he is shown with a multi-tusked elephant Airavata.

See also
 Yaksha
 Pañcika
 Kubera

References

Sources

 

Hindu gods
Buddhist gods
Fortune gods
Characters in the Ramayana
Heavenly attendants in Jainism
Yakshas